Hải Triều (born October 1, 1901 - August 6, 1954) was a journalist, theorist and literary critic of Vietnam. He was the pioneering theorist in the Vietnamese revolutionary press, especially through two major debates in the 1930s: Materialism or Idealism and Artistic Art or Art of Humanity.  His writings were strongly based on idealism and romantic literature, far from reality, emphasising "the art of art". He was also a proponent of literary realism and contributed to popularising Marxism to the public. He was an excellent scholar, not only in literature but also in philosophical and economic and international politics.

He was awarded the Ho Chi Minh Prize for Art and Literature (stage 1 - 1996).

Ho Chi Minh Prize recipients
20th-century Vietnamese poets
1901 births
1954 deaths
Vietnamese male poets
20th-century male writers